Poraqueiba sericea (common name: umari) is a species of tree in the family Metteniusaceae. It is native to South America.

Description 

P. sericea trees grow up to 30 m tall and 60 cm dbh. Bark somewhat smooth or rough, dark brown or slightly purple. Leaves broadly elliptic-ovate, coriaceous, 17–24 cm long, 8–15 cm wide, apex acuminate, base rounded. Inflorescence a terminal or axillary panicle, 5–10 cm long, flowers with ovate lanceolate petals 0.3-0.4 mm long. The fruit is a smooth ovoid-oblong drupe, 5–10 cm long, 4–6 cm wide; it can be yellowish green, orange, dark purple or black when mature.

Distribution and habitat 
P. sericea is found in the western and central Amazon rainforest in Venezuela, Colombia, Peru and Brazil.

Uses 
The fruit is edible, but the taste may not be good for people unfamiliar with the fruit.

The wood is of medium or somewhat coarse texture; heavy, compact and durable. It is used for carpentry and fuel.

References 

Metteniusaceae
Trees of Brazil
Trees of Colombia
Trees of Ecuador
Trees of Peru
Taxa named by Edmond Tulasne